Abbé René de Naurois (24 November 1906 – 12 January 2006) was a French Catholic priest, chaplain, and ornithologist.

Second World War
During the Second World War Naurois assisted the French Resistance, helped organise the escape of Jews from occupied France to Switzerland and Spain. He himself escaped from Vichy via Barcelona, Gibraltar arriving at Liverpool, and was one of the 177 Kieffer Commandos who took part in the Normandy Landings on 6 June 1944.  Honours received by de Naurois for his wartime activities include the Ordre de la Libération and the title of Righteous among the Nations.

Ornithology

Following the war Naurois became involved in ornithology, especially of the coast of West Africa and its offshore islands.  His doctoral thesis, which he defended in 1969 at the age of 63, was titled "Populations and breeding cycles of birds of the western coast of Africa from Cape Barbas, Spanish Sahara to the frontier of the Republic of Guinea".

Publications
As well as numerous papers in the scientific literature, books authored or coauthored by Naurois include:
 1994 – Les oiseaux des iles du Golfe de Guinee: Sao Tome, Prince et Annobon. Ministerio do Planeamento e da Administracao do Territorio, Secretaria de Estado da Ciencia e Tecnologia, Instituto de Investigacao Cientifica Tropical. . (In French and Portuguese).
 2004 – Aumônier de la France Libre - Mémoires. (With Jean Chaunu). Éditions Perrin.

References

External links
 René de Naurois – his activity to save Jews' lives during the Holocaust, at Yad Vashem website

1906 births
2006 deaths
20th-century French Roman Catholic priests
Abbés
French ornithologists
Companions of the Liberation
French Righteous Among the Nations
Recipients of the Croix de Guerre 1939–1945 (France)
Commandeurs of the Légion d'honneur
20th-century French zoologists